Nga Yiu Tau is a village in Shap Pat Heung, Yuen Long District, Hong Kong.

Administration
Nga Yiu Tau is a recognized village under the New Territories Small House Policy.

History
The village was originally called Lung Yin Tsuen. It was changed to the present name during World War II when newcomers settled there.

References

External links

 Delineation of area of existing village Ngar Yiu Tau (Shap Pat Heung) for election of resident representative (2019 to 2022)
 Antiquities Advisory Board. Historic Building Appraisal. Tin Hau Temple, Nga Yiu Tau, Shap Pat Heung Pictures
 Antiquities Advisory Board. Pictures of Tung Fuk Tong

Villages in Yuen Long District, Hong Kong
Shap Pat Heung